Cerca de ti is both the third Spanish single from Thalía's 2003 crossover album Thalía and the first from her 2004 Greatest Hits compilation. The ballad was written by Thalía and produced by Steve Morales. Also, an English version was previously recorded for the 2002 Thalía album, entitled "Closer to You".

"Cerca de ti" became her fourth number-one single on the Billboard Hot Latin Tracks chart.

Music video
The music video for "Cerca de ti" was directed by Jeb Brien and shot in New York City. It shows Thalía walking along the streets as an anonymous person. The video was released in January, 2004.

Official versions/remixes
"Cerca de ti" [Album Version]
"Cerca de ti" [Salsa Remix]
"Cerca de ti" [Regional Mexican Version]
"Closer to You"

Track listing
Mexican CD single (#1)
"Cerca de ti" [Grupera Version]

Mexican CD single (#2)
"Cerca de ti" [Album Version]

Chart performance

Weekly charts

Year-end charts

See also
List of number-one Billboard Hot Latin Tracks of 2004

References

Thalía songs
2004 singles
Spanish-language songs
Pop ballads
2003 songs
Songs written by David Siegel (musician)
EMI Latin singles
Songs written by Steve Morales
Songs written by Thalía
English-language Mexican songs